The notion of the digital world comprises the entirety of all individual phenomena that can be described by the concept of digital signals – including all their aspects of information processing and of graphical information interpretation into virtual worlds – or that can be influenced or transformed through the means of digital signals.

Academic usage 
Humanities and education discussions of the 'Digital era' tend to create variations when categorizing and defining the mass of mediated technologies and human interactions that are suggested as part of the Digital World. The phrase 'digital world' is used loosely as a mass noun with many possible meanings and variations.

Other types of usage 
It is most commonly used in when defining digital fluency, and digital literacy. The digital world is the availability and use of digital tools to communicate on the Internet, digital devices, smart devices and other technologies.

Examples 
 An informal example is devices given to toddlers entering the digital era.
 Formal usage includes educational policies referring to the digital world, especially in standardizing digital access. Children suffering a lack of access to the digital world are part of the digital divide. The One Laptop per Child program is an example of (digital world) inclusion for children living in poverty and suffering as part of the digital divide.

It has also made it easier for marketing in business world thus digital marketing. |url=https://blog.hubspot.com

History 
The phrase digital world was being used in electrical engineering studies before the creation of the World Wide Web. Originally it was used to describe the prevalence of digital electronic devices as opposed to analogue electronic devices. Articles on the digital world became more common in the 1990s.

See also
 Cloud computing
 Digital divide
 Global e-Schools and Communities Initiative
 Information Age
 Mobile Web
 Picture archiving and communication system 
 Virtual world
 21st century skills

References

Further reading 
 Information and communications technology

External links
 Transitioning to a Digital World
 Tracking Literacy in an Increasingly Digital World

Internet terminology
Internet culture
Digital divide
Educational technology